Alessandro Gadaletta (died 1572) was a Roman Catholic prelate who served as Bishop of Nusco (1563–1572).

Biography
On 30 Jan 1563, Alessandro Gadaletta was appointed by Pope Pius IV as Bishop of Nusco.
He served as Bishop of Nusco until his death in 1572. While bishop, he was the principal consecrator of Lelio Giordano, Bishop of Acerno.

References

External links and additional sources
 (for Chronology of Bishops) 
 (for Chronology of Bishops) 

16th-century Italian Roman Catholic bishops
1572 deaths
Bishops appointed by Pope Pius IV